Derik Pretorius (born 18 August 1998) is a South African rugby union player for the  in the Currie Cup. His regular position is lock.

Pretorius was named in the  side for the 2022 Currie Cup Premier Division.

References

South African rugby union players
Living people
Rugby union locks
Griquas (rugby union) players
Free State Cheetahs players
1998 births